Frederick George Moore (July 19, 1950 – August 25, 2022) was an American musician best known for his 1980 song "It's Not a Rumour", which he co-wrote with his ex-wife Demi Moore, and recorded with his band The Nu-Kats. The song was not a chart hit, but the video did receive airplay on MTV in the early 1980s. Moore's career spanned decades and included teaching himself to play guitar, writing the lyrics to 1,000 original songs, forming multiple bands, and even starring in a few film roles. Moore's bands performed at legendary Los Angeles clubs, including Whisky a Go Go, The Troubadour, and Starwood, and headlined alongside The Police, The Knack, and The Motels. His memoir, It's Not a Rumour, published in 2021, chronicles his unorthodox story of making it big in music and life without ever making a dime.

Early life, career beginnings 
Moore was born in Minneapolis, Minnesota, and aside from his family's brief move to San Francisco, California in 1966/67, grew up in the Twin Cities area. "I didn't have any friends and really didn't want any. I just sat in my room and played Beatles songs and wrote my own," he claims. At this point, he was known as Rick Moore.

His family moved back to Richfield, Minnesota at the start of Freddy's Junior year in high school, his third high school in as many years. Right before the family's move, Freddy and his cousin, Danny Wick, had started a band called The Royal Cumquats. Moore  graduated from Richfield, Minnesota High School in 1968. Fearful that he would be drafted to serve in the Vietnam War, he enrolled at the University of Minnesota to study Music Theory and Composition under composer Dominick Argento.

After performances with his band An English Sky, Moore started performing as Skogie, circa 1970. 

The name Skogie took hold in PE class his senior year when Moore purchased a used official school PE t-shirt that had the name "Skogie" written on it. Being new to the school, Moore's classmates took to calling him by the name on his shirt. It stuck and became part of the inspiration for Moore's third and most successful Minneapolis band, Skogie and the Flaming Pachucos. Later, the band name reverted to Skogie. Moore wore his Skogie PE shirt to every gig and soon, he was referred to as Skogie. The name "Flaming Pachucos" was a nod to Moore's favorite composer, Frank Zappa, and his deep appreciation of the Pachuco culture of East Los Angeles. 

Around this time, Moore met (and soon after married) his first wife Lucy. They were married from 1971 to 1980.

Skogie released a single in June 1972 with the help of producer/manager David Zimmerman (Bob Dylan's brother), and self-released a follow up album in 1974. Creem magazine later named Skogie one of the first power pop bands.

Move to Los Angeles

In 1976, after national touring and recording experience at three Minneapolis studios, Moore decided to head to Los Angeles along with his wife and the rest of the band. While undergoing some personnel changes, the band changed their name to The Kats, and Moore invented a new on-stage persona for the act—a cat named Freddy. 

That persona was formed from Moore's desire to write a rock opera about "a guy who was always on the wrong side of where he wanted to be. A domestic cat who longed to be an alley cat but was too scared. Not an underdog, but an undercut. An underKat." That's how Skogie became Freddy Moore and his band became The Kats, just like the "cool cats" of the 1950s. Moore took his on-stage persona very seriously and often pantomimed being a cat. 

The Kats signed a recording contract with Infinity Records in 1979, and recorded an album with Tom Petty's production team. However, just as final mixes were being completed Infinity Records was dissolved by its parent company MCA Records. The album was never released, and the master tapes remain locked in the Shelter Studios vault.

Also in 1979, Moore (then 29) met 16-year-old Demi Guynes at a nightclub. Almost immediately, despite Moore's existing marriage, the two became a couple. The two moved in together while Guynes was still 16, and married a few months later in February, after Moore's divorce from Lucy was finalized and Guynes was 17. Guynes became Demi Moore, and she continues to use that name.

Meanwhile, Moore's music career continued. Shortly after Infinity Records went under, lead guitarist Pete McRae departed The Kats, and the four remaining band members renamed themselves The Nu-Kats. They also promptly fired their management, and signed with Rhino Records. In 1980, the Nu-Kats recorded the EP Plastic Facts, featuring the track "It's Not A Rumour", which was written by Freddy and Demi Moore. Demi Moore—not yet a star—also had a prominent role in the song's video. "It's Not A Rumour" never charted, but the video would receive occasional play on MTV, especially once Demi Moore became a well-known figure after her appearances on General Hospital starting in 1982.

The Nu Kats dissolved in 1981. Moore briefly moved to the Upper West Side of Manhattan and joined local NYC band The Dates, who never recorded. After an illness in the family brought him back to Los Angeles, Moore remained in LA and formed a new pop-influenced band called Boy. Boy released an EP on Radioactive Records and Moore received a Screen Actors Guild/AFTRA card while portraying the small role of 'Arn' in the 1982 film Parasite, a 3-D movie which starred his wife Demi. The music of Boy can be heard on the soundtrack.

Boy disbanded in 1983. Moore and his brother Bobby continued writing, arranging and recording new material for approximately another year. They played a few industry showcases under the name BFM (Bobbyzio and Freddy Moore).

Though receiving multiple recording contracts, Moore refused them all, not wanting to relinquish the rights to his work. Instead, he recorded under his label, General Records.

Demi Moore filed for divorce from Moore in September 1984; the divorce became final in 1985. Of her, Freddy would later state, "I've never met a woman with a more obsessive need to be liked and loved". Freddy Moore quit the music business at around this time, although after a long layoff from performing, in 1997 he and several ex-bandmates began recording and self-releasing CDs of new material under the name The Kat Club.

Moore met his future wife, Renee, in 1981. Renee was thirteen and a budding musician. She took guitar lessons from Moore and was at every Kats/Nu Kats gig, frequently functioning as a part of the crew. They two formed a friendship that shifted to romance a decade later.

Moore and Renee, his third wife, were married in 2005.

Alzheimer's diagnosis and memoir 
A steadfast fixture in his life for over forty years, Renee noticed Moore's failing memory long before receiving his devastating diagnosis in late 2014.

"Music flows in his bloodstream, and every song he wrote was one of his children. He knew them like no one else did. I sensed something was wrong when he'd forget lyrics or wasn't able to play a song all the way through," Renee explained of her suspicion of Moore's declining heath. 

Renee finally convinced Moore to seek medical attention. Upon learning he had early-onset Alzheimer's, she was determined to do two things: slow the progression of her husband's disease through any means possible and ensure his legacy - and their love story - lived on. She did this by enlisting a writer to chronicle Moore's life story.

Accomplished content writer Shannon Guyton interviewed Freddy for over a year, compiling the incredible stories of his life as a prolific singer/songwriter and musician in the 1970s and 1980s. Renee made it her mission to slow the progression of his disease. She immersed herself in researching Alzheimer's, applying for clinic trials, exploring alternative therapies, and investigating the role of nutrition.

Recalling his life and sharing his stories with Guyton significantly slowed the hold Alzheimer's had on his memory, but a brain bleed in 2016 resulted in an abrupt decline in Moore's health that halted their collaboration. Guyton finished the book by interviewing band members, friends, family, and Renee. After keeping Moore's diagnosis a secret for years, It's Not A Rumour: A rock and roll journey through life and Alzheimer's offers complete transparency of his journey through life and with his battle against Alzheimer's.

Written by Frederick Moore and Shannon Guyton, It's Not A Rumour was published by Rare Bird Books and released September 19, 2021, seven years after Moore's official diagnosis at age 64. The book is a tribute to Moore's colorful life and musical legacy, his and Renee's enduring love story, and their fight against Alzheimer's. 

Moore lived in a care facility in Los Angeles until his death on August 25, 2022 at age 72. Renee continues to do interviews and share stories about her husband's incredible life, reaching out to music enthusiasts, fans, and those impacted by Alzheimer's disease.

Discography

Singles
 Skogie and the Flaming Pachucos: Call Me Crazy - North Country Music – 1972
 Skogie: The Butler Did It - Mill City Records – 1973

Albums and EPs
 Skogie: There's A String Attached... - General Records  – 1974
 The Nu Kats: Plastic Facts EP - Rhino Records – 1980
 Boy: Next Door EP - Radioactive Records – 1983
 The Kat Club: House Combinations - General Records – 1997
 The Kat Club: Source Mississippi - General Records – 2001
 The Kat Club: los Angelenos - General Records – 2007
 The Kats: Get Modern - General Records – 2012

Compilation and soundtrack appearances
 Various: L.A. In - Rhino Records featuring The Kats – 1979
 Various: Yes Nukes - (compilation) Rhino Records with The Nu Kats – 1981
 Film soundtrack: Parasite - featuring Boy – 1982
 Film soundtrack: Scarred - featuring Boy, The Nu Kats – 1984
 Film soundtrack: Spring Fever - featuring The Nu Kats – 1985
 Film soundtrack: Loose Screws - featuring The Nu Kats – 1985

Filmography 
I'm A Kat (1979), United Artists Pictures – Using an experimental 70mm 3D filming technique.
 It's Not A Rumor (1981), Director: Philip Brewin Cheney, Cinematographer: Jan de Bont
 Parasite (1982), Director: Charles Band, Cinematographer: Mac Ahlberg

Videography 
 "Lost My TV Guide" on Hollywood Heartbeat, the syndicated music video television series

References

External links 
Freddy Moore at Demophonic Music Publishing BMI
 
 "It's Not a Rumour, A Rock and Roll Journey Through Life and Alzheimer's" at Amazon

1950 births
Living people
American male singers
American rock singers
Musicians from Minneapolis
Songwriters from Minnesota
University of Minnesota College of Liberal Arts alumni
Singers from Minnesota
American male songwriters